Rábasebes is a village in Győr-Moson-Sopron County, Hungary along the river Rába.

The Castle Széchenyi was built at the turn of the 20th century by the Széchenyi family.

References

Populated places in Győr-Moson-Sopron County